Iredaleoconcha is a genus of air-breathing land snails or semislugs, terrestrial pulmonate gastropod mollusks in the family Euconulidae. 

This genus was named in honor of the malacologist Tom Iredale.

Species
Species within the genus Iredaleoconcha include:
 Iredaleoconcha caporaphe Preston, 1913
 Iredaleoconcha inopina Preston, 1913

References

External list
 Nomenclator Zoologicus info
 Preston, H. B. (1913). Characters of new genera and species of terrestrial Mollusca from Norfolk Island. The Annals and magazine of natural history; including zoology, botany, and geology. Eighth series. 12 (72): 522-538. London

 
Euconulidae
Taxonomy articles created by Polbot